Walker Cirque is a prominent glacier-filled cirque at the west side of the terminus of McCleary Glacier in Cook Mountains. The cirque opens to Darwin Glacier near the head. Named after Carlton Walker, Facilities, Maintenance, and Construction Supervisor at South Pole Station during United States Antarctic Program (USAP) South Pole Station Modernization

Cirques of Antarctica
Landforms of Oates Land